A toll castle is a castle that, in the Middle Ages and the Early Modern Era, guarded a customs post and was intended to control it. They were typically found in the Holy Roman Empire. Toll castles always stood in the vicinity of an important long-distance trade route over, for example, the Alpine passes or the Middle Rhine. Such castles were usually placed at strategic locations, such as border crossings, river crossings or mountain passes, and were manned by armed guards. The actual toll-collecting point lay below at the road or river and was often linked by walls to the castle itself.

Toll castles belonged to the respective territorial lords or to vassals, to whom the duty and right to collect the toll had been delegated by these lords. Most toll castles also had additional administrative and other functions, as border watch posts or residences, such as for example Stahleck Castle above Bacharach on the Rhine. Some, such as Pfalzgrafenstein Castle in the middle of the Rhine near Kaub, were, however, purely customs points and only collected tolls.

Examples

Austria

 Aggstein Castle
 Aschach an der Donau
 Hohenwerfen Castle

France
 Château d'Annecy
 Châteauneuf-du-Pape

Germany

 Katz Castle
 Maus Castle
 Pfalzgrafenstein Castle
 Rüdesheim am Rhein
 Scherenburg Castle
 Stahleck Castle

Italy

 Pont-Saint-Martin, Aosta Valley
 Reifenstein Castle
 Sarriod de la Tour Castle

Romania
 Bran Castle

Slovakia
 Strečno Castle

Switzerland
 Château de Chillon

References

Sources 
 de Fabianis, Valeria, ed. (2013). Castles of the World. New York: Metro Books. .
 Horst Wolfgang Böhme, Reinhard Friedrich, Barbara Schock-Werner, ed. (2004). Wörterbuch der Burgen, Schlösser und Festungen. Stuttgart: Philipp Reclam. . p. 272.

Castles by type
Transport buildings and structures
Castle